The Lithuanian Wikipedia is the Lithuanian version of Wikipedia. It is the largest free Lithuanian internet encyclopedia. The Wikipedia started in 2003, however gained a significant number of articles only in 2004. On December 14, 2005, the Lithuanian Wikipedia reached 10,000 articles, and on February 26, 2006, it reached 40,000 articles. The milestone of 50,000 articles was reached on August 1, 2007, and the next milestone, 100,000 articles, on January 18, 2010.

As of October 2022, it was the second most visited language Wikipedia in Lithuania, with 9 million page views in that month, only being surpassed by the English Wikipedia, with 10 million page views.

Gallery

References

External links 
  Lithuanian Wikipedia Main page
  History of Lithuanian Wikipedia
  Lithuanian Wikipedia mobile version (not fully supported)

Wikipedias by language
Internet properties established in 2003
Lithuanian-language websites
Lithuanian encyclopedias